UDP-N-acetylglucosamine 4,6-dehydratase (configuration-retaining) (PglF) is an enzyme with systematic name UDP-N-acetyl-α-Dglucosamine hydro-lyase (configuration-retaining; UDP-2-acetamido-2,6-dideoxy-α-Dxylo-hex-4-ulose-forming). This enzyme catalyses the following chemical reaction

 UDP-N-acetyl-α-D-glucosamine  UDP-2-acetamido-2,6-dideoxy-α-D-xylo-hex-4-ulose + H2O

This enzyme contains NAD+ as a cofactor.

References

External links 
 

EC 4.2.1